Stephen Allen (1767–1852) was an American politician from New York. 

Stephen Allen may also refer to:

Stephen B. Allen (born 1950), Latter-day Saint filmmaker
Stephen Haley Allen (1847–1931), Associate Justice of the Kansas Supreme Court
Stephen Allen (colonial administrator) (1882–1964), New Zealand farmer, politician and colonial administrator

See also
Steve Allen (disambiguation)
Stephen Allan (born 1973), Australian golfer
Steven Allan (born 1956), Australian footballer

Allen (surname)